In the branch of mathematics called functional analysis, a  complemented subspace of a topological vector space  is a vector subspace  for which there exists some other vector subspace  of  called its (topological) complement in , such that  is the direct sum  in the category of topological vector spaces.   Formally, topological direct sums strengthen the algebraic direct sum by requiring certain maps be continuous; the result retains many nice properties from the operation of direct sum in finite-dimensional vector spaces.   

Every finite-dimensional subspace of a Banach space is complemented, but other subspaces may not.  In general, classifying all complemented subspaces is a difficult problem, which has been solved only for some well-known Banach spaces.     

The concept of a complemented subspace is analogous to, but distinct from, that of a set complement.  The set-theoretic complement of a vector subspace is never a complementary subspace.

Preliminaries: definitions and notation

The map  is a morphism in the category of vector spaces — that is to say, linear.

Algebraic direct sum

The vector space  is said to be the algebraic direct sum (or direct sum in the category of vector spaces)  when any of the following equivalent conditions are satisfied:
The addition map  is a vector space isomorphism.
The addition map is bijective.

When these conditions hold, the inverse  is well-defined and can be written in terms of coordinates as
The first coordinate  is called the canonical projection of  onto ; likewise the second coordinate is the canonical projection onto  

Motivation 

In the category of topological vector spaces, that algebraic decomposition becomes less useful. The definition of a topological vector space requires the addition map  to be continuous; its inverse  may not be.

The addition map  is a TVS-isomorphism (that is, a surjective linear homeomorphism).
The map  is bijective and open.
When considered as additive topological groups,  is the topological direct sum of the subgroups  and 
The topological direct sum is also written ; whether the sum is in the topological or algebraic sense is usually clarified through context.

Definition 
Every topological direct sum is an algebraic direct sum ; the converse is not guaranteed.

 is called complemented if it has a topological complement  (and uncomplemented if not).  The choice of  can matter quite strongly: every complemented vector subspace  has algebraic complements that do not complement  topologically.   

Because a linear map between two normed (or Banach) spaces is bounded if and only if it is continuous, the definition in the categories of normed (resp. Banach) spaces is the same as in topological vector spaces.

Equivalent characterizations 
The vector subspace  is complemented in  if and only if any of the following holds:
There exists a continuous linear map  with image  such that ;
 There exists a continuous linear projection  with image  such that  .
 For every TVS  the restriction map  is surjective.
If in addition  is Banach, then an equivalent condition is

Examples

Sufficient conditions

This is because  has the indiscrete topology, and so the algebraic projection is continuous.

Finite dimension 
Suppose  is Hausdorff and locally convex and  a free topological vector subspace: for some set , we have  (as a t.v.s.).

For an example in which this fails, see .

Finite codimension 
Not all finite-codimensional vector subspaces of a TVS are closed, but those that are, do have complements.

Hilbert spaces 
This property characterizes Hilbert spaces within the class of Banach spaces: every infinite dimensional, non-Hilbert Banach space contains a closed uncomplemented subspace.

Fréchet spaces 
Let  be a Fréchet space over the field .  Then the following are equivalent:

  is not normable (that is, any continuous norm does not generate the topology)
  contains a vector subspace TVS-isomorphic to 

Properties; examples of uncomplemented subspaces

From the existence of Hamel bases, every infinite-dimensional Banach space contains unclosed linear subspaces.  Since any complemented subspace is closed, none of those subspaces is complemented.  

Applications 
If  is a continuous linear surjection, then the following conditions are equivalent:
 The kernel of  has a topological complement.
 There exists a "right inverse": a continuous linear map  such that , where  is the identity map.

The Method of Decomposition 
Topological vector spaces admit the following Cantor-Schröder-Bernstein–type theorem:

In classical Banach spaces

Understanding the complemented subspaces of an arbitrary Banach space  up to isomorphism is a classical problem that has motivated much work in basis theory, particularly the development of absolutely summing operators.  The problem remains open for a variety of important Banach spaces, most notably the space .  

For some Banach spaces the question is closed. These are not the only prime spaces, however.

The spaces  are not prime whenever  in fact, they admit uncountably many non-isomorphic complemented subspaces. 

Indecomposable Banach spaces

An infinite-dimensional Banach space is called indecomposable whenever its only complemented subspaces are either finite-dimensional or -codimensional.  Because a finite-codimensional subspace of a Banach space  is always isomorphic to  indecomposable Banach spaces are prime.

The most well-known example of indecomposable spaces are in fact  indecomposable, which means every infinite-dimensional subspace is also indecomposable.

See also

Proofs

References

Bibliography

  
  
  
  
  
  
  
 

Functional analysis